Raimal is a village in Dera Baba Nanak in the Gurdaspur district of Punjab State, India. The village is administrated by the Sarpanch, an elected representative of the village.

Demography 
, the village has a total number of 112 houses and the population of 573 people, of which 304 are males and 269 are females.  According to the report published by Census India in 2011, 0 people from the village are from Schedule Caste; the village does not have any Schedule Tribe population so far.

See also 
List of villages in India

References

External links 
 Tourism of Punjab
 Census of Punjab

Villages in Gurdaspur district